Happy Journey is a studio album by American country singer–songwriter Hank Locklin. It was released in January 1962 via RCA Victor Records and was produced by Chet Atkins. Happy Journey was Locklin's third studio album released in his recording career. It contained a total of 12 tracks, three of which were hits on the country chart: "You're the Reason," "Happy Birthday to Me" and the title track. It included a combination of new recordings and cover versions of songs previously recorded by other artists.

Background and content
In 1960, Hank Locklin had achieved his biggest hit with "Please Help Me, I'm Falling." The song topped the country charts but also became an international hit. From its success, he had several follow-up hits which would also prove to be successful. Several of these hits would be included in Locklin's album, Happy Journey. The sessions for the album took place between 1960 and 1961 in the RCA Studio, located in Nashville, Tennessee. The sessions were produced by Chet Atkins. He had also produced Locklin's two previous studio efforts for the RCA label in 1958 and 1960.

Happy Journey contained a total of 12 tracks, all of which were written by other songwriters. Many of these tracks were cover versions of songs first made famous by other music artists. This included a cover of Bobby Edwards' "You're the Reason," Don Gibson's "I Can't Stop Loving You" and Tex Ritter's "Jealous Heart." Locklin also re-recorded his 1953 hit, "Let Me Be the One," which he first cut for the Four Star label. New material for the album included the title track, "Happy Birthday to Me" and "Johnny My Love (Grandma's Diary)."

Release
Happy Journey was released in January 1962 on RCA Victor Records. It was Locklin's third studio album issued in his career. The record was distributed as a vinyl LP, containing six tracks on both sides of the record. In total the album contained three singles that were major hits for Locklin. The first to be a hit was "You're the Reason," which was released in July 1961. The single spent 12 weeks on the Billboard Hot Country Songs and peaked at number 14 by November. Its B-side was "Happy Birthday to Me." The song also became a hit in November 1961, peaking at number seven on the Billboard country singles chart. The final single included in the album was its title track, which was released as a single in November 1961. It spent a total of 12 weeks on the Billboard country survey and peaked at number ten on the list in February 1962.

Track listing

Personnel
All credits are adapted from the liner notes of Happy Journey.

Musical personnel
 Floyd Cramer – piano
 Buddy Harman – drums
 Hank Garland – guitar
 The Jordanaires – background vocals
 Anita Kerr – accordion
 The Anita Kerr Singers – background vocals
 Hank Locklin – lead vocals
 Dutch McMillin – saxophone
 Bob Moore – bass
 Velma Smith – guitar
 Gordon Stoker – accordion

Technical personnel
 Chet Atkins – producer
 Archie Campbell – liner notes
 Bill Porter – engineer

Release history

References

1962 albums
Albums produced by Chet Atkins
Hank Locklin albums
RCA Victor albums